Buchiana railway station is located in Faisalabad District, Jaranwala Tehsil Pakistan In Buchiana Mandi.

See also
 List of railway stations in Pakistan
 Pakistan Railways

References

External links

Railway stations in Faisalabad District
Railway stations on Shorkot–Sheikhupura line